Sweet Valley Junior High is a fictional young adult book series written by Francine Pascal. The first book of the series, Get Real, was published on February 1, 1999. The final entry in the series, Too Many Good-byes, was published on June 12, 2001.

Plot
The story occurs when Jessica and Elizabeth Wakefield's middle school have been rezoned to Sweet Valley Jr. High for 8th grade. Elizabeth adjusts quickly to the new school and becomes popular among her peers. She becomes close friends with Anna Wang and Salvador del Valle, and the three are actively involved with producing the school's alternative zine. Anna and Salvador are long-time best friends, though their relationship is complicated by Salvador's growing feelings for Elizabeth. Elizabeth's friends also include her locker mate Brian Rainey and Blue Spicolli, who later becomes Elizabeth's boyfriend.

Jessica does not adapt to Sweet Valley Junior High as quickly as Elizabeth, especially as she struggles to establish some semblance of the popularity she enjoyed in middle school. She soon becomes frenemies with popular girl Lacey Frells, who antagonizes Jessica. Lacey's best friend, Kristin Seltzer, is considerably friendlier and more welcoming to Jessica. Jessica also joins the track team and becomes close friends with the team's star, Bethel McCoy, and finds a love interest in Damon Ross, a ninth grader.

Characters
Elizabeth Wakefield: Although initially unhappy with being forced to attend a new school, Elizabeth quickly adjusts and finds new friends, particularly with Anna Wang and Salvador del Valle. She becomes a member of the school paper, The Spectator. She later dates Blue Spicolli, though her relationship with Blue and her friendship with Anna become complicated with growing feelings between Elizabeth and Salvador.

Jessica Wakefield: Despite Jessica's expectations, she is dismayed to find that her popularity in middle school does not translate to junior high. Her attempts to drive away her geeky but helpful locker mate Ronald Rheese and inability to become friends with the popular Lacey Frells eventually result in Jessica taking a different path, where she joins the track team. Jessica becomes friends with Bethel McCoy, her teammate on the track team, and Kristin Seltzer.

Anna Wang: One of Elizabeth's classmates who becomes her friend at junior high, Anna is interested in poetry and later joins the drama club. She and Salvador have been best-friends since childhood. Her older brother Tim died in a car accident only a few years earlier and she still grieves his death.

Salvador del Valle: One of Elizabeth's classmates, who tends to joke around a lot. Salvador quickly develops feelings for Elizabeth, though he does not act on them due to possibly straining his friendship with Anna and seeming lack of interest from Elizabeth. He lives with his grandmother, as his parents are frequently away working.

Kristin Seltzer: One of the popular girls at school, Kristin is friendly and welcoming. She becomes the student council president, but finds the responsibility often leaves her invisible when she struggles with the pressure.

Lacey Frells: One of the most popular girls at school, Lacey is Kristin's best friend but is snobby and antagonistic towards Jessica. She lives with her father and stepmother, whom she does not get along with, and hides her disappointment when her successful mother shows little genuine interest in Lacey.

Bethel McCoy: The star of the track team, who initially thinks Jessica is superficial. When Jessica shows how far she will push herself to be a real member of the track team, she earns Bethel's respect and they become friends. She has no interest in romantic relationships, preferring to focus on being an athlete.

Brian Rainey: Elizabeth's locker mate and a member of The Spectator with Elizabeth, Anna, and Salvador. He has a long-standing mutual crush on Kristin, who is his childhood friend, but neither of them believes the other's feelings are reciprocated.

Damon Ross: Jessica's boyfriend, a ninth-grader.

Ronald Rheece: Jessica's geek locker partner, who is kind to her despite Jessica's desperation to find cooler friends. He makes a brief cameo appearance in Sweet Valley Senior Year.

Lila Fowler: Jessica's best friend, who still attends Sweet Valley Middle School. As Jessica's interests have changed since attending junior high, she and Lila begin to drift apart. However, Jessica still feels compelled to prove to Lila that she maintains the same popularity she had in middle school.

Blue Spicolli: An easy-going boy who enjoys surfing and has little interest in school. He winds up becoming Elizabeth's boyfriend.

Larissa Harris: A British girl with a wild personality who becomes friends with Anna when she joins the drama club. Because she focuses on performing well in her drama class, she has fallen behind in the rest of her classes with little care. She has a crush on Toby.

Toby Martin (Toby Meeker when introduced): A member of the drama club, who takes an interest in Anna and later becomes her boyfriend.

List of books

References

 https://www.amazon.com/Get-Real-Sweet-Valley-High/dp/0553486039/ref=sr_1_1?ie=UTF8&qid=1435355878&sr=8-1&keywords=sweet+valley+jr+high+get+real
 http://www.goodreads.com/book/show/1476378.Get_Real

Novels set in California
Sweet Valley (franchise)